Doha Kang (born 1969) is a manhwa artist of South Korea. Kang wrote The Great Catsby and Romance Killer. Before 2005, when he presented The Great Catsby on Daum, one of the major Internet portals of South Korea, Kang signed his work with his birth name, Kang Seong-su. He is also the spouse of a famous manhwa artist, Won Soo-yeon (원수연), author of Full House, which was adapted into the television drama of the same name. Won is eight years older than Kang and they have two children.

In 1987 Kang won the Myeongrang Manhwa Artist Award for his work Father and Son (아버지와 아들) in the 4th New Manhwa Artist Award that was held by monthly magazine Bomulseom (Treasure Island)'s publishing company. At that time he still was a junior high school student. Although he began working as a manhwa artist immediately after graduation, he decided to become one when in the junior year of middle school, in 1983. For that reason, the last digits of his mobile phone number are 1983.

Works
 Romance Killer (2006)
 The Great Catsby (2005)

Awards
2006, Best Readers' Award
2005, Best Korean Manhwa, Korea Culture & Content Committee
2005, Our Manhwa Award of Today
2004, Independent Best Art in the Year's Art Award
2001, Our Manhwa Award of Today

References

1969 births
Living people
South Korean manhwa artists